Belalagere is a village in Channagiri taluk, Davanagere district in the Indian state of Karnataka. It is around 30 km from Davangere.

Demographics 
Kannada is the local language spoken here. The total population of the village is 3825 as per 2011 census.

Education and business 
Belalagere have following schools, up to 10th standard only.

Primary with Upper Primary Schools and High Schools:

Post office details

References 

Villages in Davanagere district